A metric prefix is a unit prefix that precedes a basic unit of measure to indicate a multiple or submultiple of the unit. All metric prefixes used today are decadic. Each prefix has a unique symbol that is prepended to any unit symbol. The prefix kilo-, for example, may be added to gram to indicate multiplication by one thousand: one kilogram is equal to one thousand grams. The prefix milli-, likewise, may be added to metre to indicate division by one thousand; one millimetre is equal to one thousandth of a metre.

Decimal multiplicative prefixes have been a feature of all forms of the metric system, with six of these dating back to the system's introduction in the 1790s. Metric prefixes have also been used with some non-metric units. The SI prefixes are metric prefixes that were standardised for use in the International System of Units (SI) by the International Bureau of Weights and Measures (BIPM) in resolutions dating from 1960 to 2022. Since 2009, they have formed part of the ISO/IEC 80000 standard. They are also used in the Unified Code for Units of Measure (UCUM).

List of SI prefixes 

The BIPM specifies twenty-four prefixes for the International System of Units (SI).

First uses of prefixes in SI date back to definition of kilogram after the French Revolution at the end of the 18th century.  Several more prefixes came into use by the 1947 IUPAC 14th International Conference of Chemistry before being officially adopted for the first time in 1960.

The most recent prefixes adopted were ronna-, quetta-, ronto-, and quecto- in 2022, after a proposal from British metrologist Richard J. C. Brown. The large prefixes ronna- and quetta- were adopted in anticipation of needs from data science, and because unofficial prefixes that did not meet SI requirements were already circulating. The small prefixes were added as well even without such a driver in order to maintain symmetry.

Rules 
 The symbols for the units of measure are combined with the symbols for each prefix name. The SI symbols for kilometre, kilogram, and kilowatt, for instance, are km, kg, and kW, respectively. (The symbol for kilo- is k.) Except for the early prefixes of kilo-, hecto-, and deca-, the symbols for the prefixes for multiples are uppercase letters, and those for the prefixes for submultiples are lowercase letters.
 All of the metric prefix symbols are made from upper- and lower-case Latin letters except for the symbol for micro, which is uniquely a Greek letter "".
 Like the numbers they combine with, SI units and unit symbols are never shown in italics.  The prefixes and their symbols are always prefixed to the symbol for the unit without any intervening space or punctuation.  This distinguishes a prefixed unit symbol from the product of unit symbols, for which a space or mid-height dot as separator is required.  So, for instance, while 'ms' means millisecond, 'm s' or 'm·s' means metre second.
 Prefixes corresponding to an integer power of one thousand are generally preferred, and the prefixes for tens (deci-, deca-) and hundreds (cent-, hecto-) are disfavoured. Hence 100 m is preferred over 1 hm (hectometre) or 10 dam (decametres). The prefixes deci- and centi-, and less frequently hecto- and deca-, are commonly used for everyday purposes; the centimetre (cm) is especially common. Some modern building codes require that the millimetre be used in preference to the centimetre, because "use of centimetres leads to extensive usage of decimal points and confusion". Deprecated prefixes are also used to create metric units corresponding to older conventional units, for example hectares and hectopascals.
 Prefixes may not be used in combination on a single symbol. This includes the case of the base unit kilogram, which already contains a prefix. For example, milligram (mg) is used instead of microkilogram (μkg).
 In the arithmetic of measurements having units, the units are treated as multiplicative factors to values. In the product of multiple units, each individual unit prefix must be evaluated as a separate numeric multiplier and then combined with the others.
 A prefix symbol attached to a unit symbol is included when the unit is raised to a power. For example, km2 is km × km, not km × m.

Usage

Examples 
 The mass of an electron is about 1 rg (rontogram).
 The mass of 1 litre of water is about 1 kg (kilogram).
 The mass of the Earth is about 6 Rg (ronnagrams).
 The mass of Jupiter is about 2 Qg (quettagrams).

Examples of powers of units with metric prefixes 
In other words, an area of  square metres and not  square metres.

Examples with prefixes and powers 
  ×  =  ×  =  = .
  +  =  +  = .
  =  =  = 0.05 m.
  =  =  =  =  = .
 3 MW =  = 3 ×  = .

Micro symbol 

When mega and micro were adopted in 1873, there were then three prefaces starting with "m", so it was necessary to use some other symbol besides upper and lowercase 'm'. Eventually the Greek letter "µ" was adopted.

However various other abbreviations remained common, including "mic", "mm", and "u", in part motivated by the lack of a "µ" key on most typewriters.

From about 1960 onwards, "u" prevailed in type-written documents. Because ASCII, EBCDIC, and other common encodings lacked code-points for "µ", this tradition remained even as computers replaced typewriters.

When ISO 8859-1 was created, it included the "" symbol for micro at codepoint .

The whole of ISO 8859-1 was incorporated into the initial version of Unicode, but subsequently Unicode version 6 deprecated the micro symbol on codepoint  in favour of the Greek letter "" on codepoint .

However, it remains widely implemented due to its prevalence in older documents, especially on POSIX systems where UTF-8 has historically been well tolerated by utilities that previously handled ASCII.

Keyboard entry 

Most keyboards do not have a "µ" key, so it is necessary to use a key-chord; this varies depending on the operating system, physical keyboard layout, and user's language.

For all keyboard layouts
 On Microsoft Windows systems,
 arbitrary Unicode codepoints can be entered in hexadecimal as: ; note that a leading "0" is required, or
 in the tradition of MS-DOS, IBM code page 437 code-points can be entered in decimal:  (this is recorded as the corresponding Unicode code-point);
 On Linux systems,
 arbitrary Unicode codepoints can be entered in hexadecimal as:  , or

For QWERTY keyboard layouts
 On Linux systems,

Typesetting in Latex 

The LaTeX typesetting system features an SIunitx package in which the units of measurement are spelled out, for example,
 \SI{3}{\tera\hertz} formats as "3 THz".

Application to units of measurement 
The use of prefixes can be traced back to the introduction of the metric system in the 1790s, long before the 1960 introduction of the SI. The prefixes, including those introduced after 1960, are used with any metric unit, whether officially included in the SI or not (e.g., millidyne and milligauss). Metric prefixes may also be used with some non-metric units, but not, for example, with the non-SI units of time.

Metric units

Mass 
The units kilogram, gram, milligram, microgram, and smaller are commonly used for measurement of mass. However, megagram, gigagram, and larger are rarely used; tonnes (and kilotonnes, megatonnes, etc.) or scientific notation are used instead. The megagram does not share the risk of confusion that the tonne has with other units with the name "ton".

The kilogram is the only coherent unit of the International System of Units that includes a metric prefix.

Volume 
The litre (equal to a cubic decimetre), millilitre (equal to a cubic centimetre), microlitre, and smaller are common. In Europe, the centilitre is often used for liquids, and the decilitre is used less frequently. Bulk agricultural products, such as grain, beer and wine, often use the hectolitre (100 litres).

Larger volumes are usually denoted in kilolitres, megalitres or gigalitres, or else in cubic metres (1 cubic metre = 1 kilolitre) or cubic kilometres (1 cubic kilometre = 1 teralitre). For scientific purposes, the cubic metre is usually used.

Length 
The kilometre, metre, centimetre, millimetre, and smaller units are common. The decimetre is rarely used. The micrometre is often referred to by the older non-SI name micron. In some fields, such as chemistry, the ångström (0.1 nm) has been used commonly instead of the nanometre. The femtometre, used mainly in particle physics, is sometimes called a fermi. For large scales, megametre, gigametre, and larger are rarely used. Instead, ad hoc non-metric units are used, such as the solar radius, astronomical units, light years, and parsecs; the astronomical unit is mentioned in the SI standards as an accepted non-SI unit.

Time 

Prefixes for the SI standard unit second are most commonly encountered for quantities less than one second. For larger quantities, the system of minutes (60 seconds), hours (60 minutes) and days (24 hours) is accepted for use with the SI and more commonly used. When speaking of spans of time, the length of the day is usually standardised to  seconds so as not to create issues with the irregular leap second.

Larger multiples of the second such as kiloseconds and megaseconds are occasionally encountered in scientific contexts, but are seldom used in common parlance. For long-scale scientific work, particularly in astronomy, the Julian year or annum is a standardised variant of the year, equal to exactly  seconds ( days). The unit is so named because it was the average length of a year in the  Julian calendar. Long time periods are then expressed by using metric prefixes with the annum, such as megaannum or gigaannum.

Angle 
The SI unit of angle is the radian, but degrees, as well as arc-minutes and arc-seconds, see some scientific use.

Temperature 
Common practice does not typically use the flexibility allowed by official policy in the case of the degree Celsius (°C). NIST states: "Prefix symbols may be used with the unit symbol °C and prefix names may be used with the unit name degree Celsius. For example, 12 m°C (12 millidegrees Celsius) is acceptable." In practice, it is more common for prefixes to be used with the kelvin when it is desirable to denote extremely large or small absolute temperatures or temperature differences. Thus, temperatures of star interiors may be given in units of MK (megakelvins), and molecular cooling may be described in mK (millikelvins).

Energy 
In use the joule and kilojoule are common, with larger multiples seen in limited contexts. In addition, the kilowatt-hour, a composite unit formed from the kilowatt and hour, is often used for electrical energy; other multiples can be formed by modifying the prefix of watt (e.g. terawatt-hour).

There exist a number of definitions for the non-SI unit, the calorie. There are gram calories and kilogram calories. One kilogram calorie, which equals one thousand gram calories, often appears capitalised and without a prefix (i.e. Cal) when referring to "dietary calories" in food. It is common to apply metric prefixes to the gram calorie, but not to the kilogram calorie: thus, 1 kcal = 1000 cal = 1 Cal.

Non-metric units 
Metric prefixes are widely used outside the metric SI system. Common examples include the megabyte and the decibel. Metric prefixes rarely appear with imperial or US units except in some special cases (e.g., microinch, kilofoot, kilopound). They are also used with other specialised units used in particular fields (e.g., megaelectronvolt, gigaparsec, millibarn, kilodalton).  In astronomy, geology, and palaeontology, the year, with symbol a (from the Latin annus), is commonly used with metric prefixes: ka, Ma, and Ga.

Official policies about the use of SI prefixes with non-SI units vary slightly between the International Bureau of Weights and Measures (BIPM) and the American National Institute of Standards and Technology (NIST). For instance, the NIST advises that 'to avoid confusion, prefix symbols (and prefix names) are not used with the time-related unit symbols (names) min (minute), h (hour), d (day); nor with the angle-related symbols (names) ° (degree), ′ (minute), and ″ (second), whereas the BIPM adds information about the use of prefixes with the symbol as for arcsecond when they state: "However astronomers use milliarcsecond, which they denote mas, and microarcsecond, μas, which they use as units for measuring very small angles."

Non-standard prefixes

Obsolete metric prefixes 
Some of the prefixes formerly used in the metric system have fallen into disuse and were not adopted into the SI. The decimal prefix for ten thousand, myria- (sometimes spelled myrio-), and the early binary prefixes double- (2×) and demi- (×) were parts of the original metric system adopted by France in 1795, but were not retained when the SI prefixes were internationally adopted by the 11th CGPM conference in 1960.

Other metric prefixes used historically include hebdo- (107) and micri- (10−14).

Double prefixes 
Double prefixes have been used in the past, such as micromillimetres or millimicrons (now nanometres), micromicrofarads (μμF; now picofarads, pF), kilomegatonnes (now gigatonnes), hectokilometres (now 100 kilometres) and the derived adjective hectokilometric (typically used for qualifying the fuel consumption measures). These are not compatible with the SI.

Other obsolete double prefixes included "decimilli-" (10−4), which was contracted to "dimi-" and standardised in France up to 1961.

There are no more letters of the Latin alphabet available for new prefixes (all the unused letters are already used for units). As such, Richard J. C. Brown (who proposed the prefixes adopted for 10±27 and 10±30) has proposed a reintroduction of compound prefixes (e.g. kiloquetta- for 1033) if a driver for prefixes at such scales ever materialises, with a restriction that the last prefix must always be quetta- or quecto-. This usage is not currently approved by the BIPM.

Similar symbols and abbreviations 
In written English, the symbol K is often used informally to indicate a multiple of thousand in many contexts. For example, one may talk of a 40K salary, or call the Year 2000 problem the Y2K problem. In these cases, an uppercase K is often used with an implied unit (although it could then be confused with the symbol for the kelvin temperature unit if the context is unclear). This informal postfix is read or spoken as "thousand" or "grand", or just "k".

The financial and general news media mostly use m or M, b or B, and t or T as abbreviations for million, billion (109) and trillion (1012), respectively, for large quantities, typically currency and population. 

The medical and automotive fields in the United States use the abbreviations cc or ccm for cubic centimetres. One cubic centimetre is equal to one millilitre.

For nearly a century, engineers used the abbreviation MCM to designate a "thousand circular mils" in specifying the cross-sectional area of large electrical cables. Since the mid-1990s, kcmil has been adopted as the official designation of a thousand circular mils, but the designation MCM still remains in wide use. A similar system is used in natural gas sales in the United States: m (or M) for thousands and mm (or MM) for millions of British thermal units or therms, and in the oil industry, where MMbbl is the symbol for "millions of barrels". This usage of the capital letter M for "thousand" is from Roman numerals, in which M means 1000.

Binary prefixes 

The original metric system adopted by France in 1795 included the two binary prefixes double- (2×) and demi- (×). However, they were not retained when the SI prefixes were internationally adopted by the 11th CGPM conference in 1960.

In some fields of information technology, it has been common to designate non-decimal multiples based on powers of 1024, rather than 1000, for some SI prefixes (kilo-, mega-, giga-), contrary to the definitions in the International System of Units (SI). The SI does not permit the metric prefixes to be used in this conflicting sense. This practice was once sanctioned by some industry associations, including JEDEC. The International Electrotechnical Commission (IEC) standardised the system of binary prefixes (kibi-, mebi-, gibi-, etc.) for this purpose.

See also 

 Binary prefix
 Engineering notation
 E1 series (preferred numbers)
 Indian numbering system
 International vocabulary of metrology
 ISO/IEC 80000
 Names of large numbers
 Names of small numbers
 Number names
 Numeral prefix
 Order of magnitude
 Orders of magnitude (data)
 RKM code
 SI base unit
 Unified Code for Units of Measure

Footnotes

References

External links 
 International Bureau of Weights and Measures (BIPM)
 SI prefixes at BIPM
 US NIST Definitions of the SI units: The twenty SI prefixes
 US NIST Definitions of the SI units: The binary prefixes

 
Numeral systems